The 1994 AAA Championships was an outdoor track and field competition organised by the Amateur Athletic Association (AAA), held from 11–12 July at Don Valley Stadium in Sheffield, England. It was the first and only time that the AAA Championships was held at that venue. It was considered the de facto national championships for the United Kingdom.

Many top British athletes were absent from the competition.

Medal summary

Men

Women

References

AAA Championships
AAA Championships
Athletics Outdoor
AAA Championships
Sports competitions in Sheffield
Athletics competitions in England